The Portrait of Giovanni Emo is an oil on panel  painting by Italian Renaissance artist Giovanni Bellini, executed around 1495–1500. It is housed in the National Gallery of Art at Washington, DC, United States.

History
The portrait is one of Bellini's more evolved in this field, an activity he had started around 1474. The provenance of the work is unknown, as it is known only from 1786 when the Venetian doctor Pellegrini sold to  Sir Abraham Hume. The latter's heirs sold it on the London market   1923   and again in 1936, when it was bought by  the Samuel H. Kress Foundation. It was donated to the current American museum in 1939.

Description
The painting portrays an unknown, aged Italian condottiero's bust, seen from three-quarters above a dark background. The basic influence is still that of Antonello da Messina. The subject was once identified as Jacopo Marcello, capitano general of the Republic of Venice, which led to an early dating around  1482-1485; Bellini had executed a portrait for Marcello in his family house. Other identifications include Bartolomeo d'Alviano (basing on a statement by later Renaissance art historian Giorgio Vasari) and Giovanni Emo, implying that it could have been executed around in 1475–1500.

The condottiere wears a precious brocade blouse and a blue beret. His features are deep, and has a fierce expression.

Sources

Condottiero
1490s paintings
Collections of the National Gallery of Art
Condotierro